Mary Katharine Gaillard (born April 1, 1939) is an American theoretical physicist. Her focus is on particle physics. She is a professor of the Graduate School at the University of California, Berkeley, a member of the Berkeley Center for Theoretical Physics, and visiting scientist at the Lawrence Berkeley National Laboratory. She was Berkeley's first tenured female physicist.

Her important contributions include prediction of the mass of the charm quark prior to its discovery (with B. W. Lee); prediction of 3-jet events (with J. Ellis and G.G. Ross); and prediction of b-quark mass (with M.S. Chanowitz and J. Ellis). Gaillard's autobiography is A Singularly Unfeminine Profession, published in 2015 by World Scientific.

Early life
Mary Katharine Ralph was born April 1, 1939 in New Brunswick, New Jersey, and grew up in Painesville, Ohio, where her father taught history at Lake Erie College.

She attended Hollins College in Virginia as an undergraduate. Her physics professor, Dorothy Montgomery, helped her to find work in the Louis Leprince-Ringuet laboratory in France during a year abroad, and at Brookhaven National Labs in the summer. She received her bachelor's degree from Hollins in 1960. She received her master's degree from Columbia University in 1961. 

At the end of her first year at Columbia she married Jean-Marc Gaillard, a visiting physics postdoctoral student. She moved with him, first to the University of Paris at Orsay, France and a year later to the European Organization for Nuclear Research (CERN) in Geneva, Switzerland. Despite experiencing sexism and having three children, she continued to study theoretical physics. In 1964 she obtained her Doctorat du Troisième Cycle from the University of Paris at Orsay, France. In 1968, she completed her Doctorat d'Etat in Theoretical Physics there.

Career
During her time at CERN (1964-1981) Gaillard was considered a visiting scientist, first as a student from Orsay, and later as a research scientist employed by the French National Centre for Scientific Research (CNRS). At one point, she carried out and submitted a survey of women scientists at CERN, documenting clear patterns of blatant sexism against women scientists in hiring and salaries. 

Nonetheless, her scientific achievements at CERN led to her advancement at CNRS. 
In 1979 Gaillard established a particle theory group at the Laboratoire d'Annecy-le-Vieux de physique des particules (LAPP), Annecy-le-Vieux, France. She directed the group from 1979 to 1981. She served as Director of Research at Annecy-le-Vieux for the CNRS from 1980-1981. In 1981, the Gaillards divorced, and she returned to the United States.  

Gaillard joined the physics department at the Berkeley in 1981, becoming the first woman Professor of Physics. She was concurrently a Faculty Senior Staff member at Lawrence Berkeley National Laboratory (LBNL), where she headed the Theory Group from 1985 to 1987.

Gaillard served on several committees of the American Physical Society, advisory panels for the Department of Energy and the United States National Research Council, and on advisory and visiting committees at universities and national laboratories. She was a member of the National Science Board from 1996 to 2002.

Research
Her research accomplishments include pioneering work with Benjamin W. Lee on the evaluation of strong interaction corrections to weak transitions, including the successful prediction of the mass of the charm quark; work with John Ellis and others on the analysis of final states in electron-positron collisions, including the prediction of Three-jet events, and studies of unified gauge theories, including the prediction of the bottom quark mass; studies with Michael Chanowitz of signatures at proton-proton colliders which showed, on very general grounds, that new physics must show up at sufficiently high energies. Her later work focused on effective supergravity theories based on superstrings, and their implications for phenomena that may be detected both in accelerator experiments and cosmological observations.

Awards and honors
 1977, Prix Thibaud, Academy of Sciences, Humanities and Arts of Lyon
 1984, Fellow of the American Physical Society
 1988, E.O. Lawrence Memorial Award, U. S. Department of Energy
 1989, Fellow of the American Academy of Arts and Sciences
 1991, Member of National Academy of Sciences
 1993, J. J. Sakurai Prize for Theoretical Particle Physics
 2000, Member of the American Philosophical Society

Personal life
She married Jean Marc Gaillard with whom she had three children - Alain, Dominique and Bruno. Later, she married Bruno Zumino.

References

External links
UC Berkeley Faculty webpage
Oral history interview transcript for Mary K. Gaillard on 2 April 2020, American Institute of Physics, Niels Bohr Library & Archives
Scientific publications of M. K. Gaillard on INSPIRE-HEP
Symposium for Mary K. Gaillard

1939 births
Living people
American women physicists
Fellows of the American Academy of Arts and Sciences
Members of the United States National Academy of Sciences
J. J. Sakurai Prize for Theoretical Particle Physics recipients
People associated with CERN
University of California, Berkeley faculty
Hollins University alumni
Columbia University alumni
Paris-Sud University alumni
20th-century American physicists
21st-century American physicists
21st-century American scientists
20th-century American women scientists
21st-century American women scientists
Members of the American Philosophical Society
Fellows of the American Physical Society
Fellows of the American Association for the Advancement of Science